N. K. Venkataramana is an Indian neurosurgeon and the founder of ANSA Research Foundation, a non profit non governmental organization promoting research on neuroscience, neurological disorders, cancer biology, stem cells and tumor tissue repository. He is a recipient of Dr. B. C. Roy Award, the highest Indian award in the medical category and the Rajyotsava Prashasti, the second highest civilian award of the Government of Karnataka.

Biography
N. K. Venkataramana graduated in medicine (MBBS) from the Sri Venkateswara Institute of Medical Sciences, Tirupati and secured a master's degree (MCh) in neurosurgery after which he completed fellowship at the National Institute of Mental Health and Neurosciences (NIMHANS), Bengaluru. He also underwent advanced training at Nordtstud Krankenhause, Germany and secured a fellowship. His career started as an assistant professor at NIMHANS in 1986 where he stayed till 1991 to move to Manipal Hospital, Bengaluru as a consultant neurosurgeon. In 2001, he founded the Manipal Institute for Neurological Disorders, Neurosciences division of the hospital. In 2007, he moved to BGS Global Hospital as a director and established Global Institute of Neurosciences at Kengeri, a suburb of Bengaluru. He worked as the chief neurosurgeon of the institute and as the vice chairman of BGS Global Hospitals. He founded BRAINS (Bangalore Regenerative Advanced Institute of Neurosciences).

BRAINS

BRAINS has established a 24/7 call centre to help people both in case of an emergency and to guide otherwise. The helpline 1062 addresses all the emergencies and 9148080000 works as a Neuro helpline to guide the patients and their families. 24/7 Emergency services is available at all the BRAINS centres. A technology driven E-ICU is created for the first time. This will enable us in the implementation of standards, and continuous real time monitoring ensuring quality as well as seamless connectivity of our patients across all the hospitals. 
BRAINS hospitals cater to every single neurological disease among all ages. We have also established dedicated trauma centre’s to deal with injuries, Stroke, most effectively within the golden hour. In addition, special clinics for Parkinson’s’ disease, Multiple Sclerosis, Epilepsy, Brain tumors, and Auto-immune Neurological disorders remains as our forte. Advocacy for prevention of Road traffic accidents and Stroke has been our major mission.

BRAINS hospital also provides Comprehensive care for all the problems associated with spine. All our hospitals provide total care starting from developmental defects in children to degenerative diseases of spine in adults. Apart from holistic treatment, we do offer tailor made solutions to the individual needs. 
Brains operate from 5 hospitals located at SSNMC Hospital RR Nagar, Sparsh Hospital Infantry Road, MVJ Hospital Hosakote, Cytecare Hospital, New Airport Road, and Aveksha Hospital Singapura, Jalahalli. Of which Cyte care- Brains and MVJ - Brains further specialises as Oncology and Educational centres respectively.

Hybrid operating room, Microdialysis for Neurocrical care, interventions for Stroke and Brain attack, 3D imaging of spine, Golden hour for head injury and Stroke awareness campaigns some of our unique initiatives. 
The magazine "Brain Voice" is yet another initiative to create awareness about brain, spine, spirituality and related issues to the people of all walks of life. This is a bilingual monthly magazine, both in English and Kannada with a huge readership.

"Golden Hour" is a social initiative of BRAINS advocating timely and quality care in Emergencies with an access number 1062. Empowering people with first aid and life saving measures, awareness creation, advocacy, network of quick access clinics to treat within the first hour, protocol development, standardisation of care, training and preparedness initiatives are the main activities of Golden Hour.

Professional associations
Venkataramana is a member of the Neurological Society of India, Indian Society for Cerebro Vascular Surgery, American Association of Neurological Surgeons, International Society of Paediatric Neurosurgery, New York Academy of Sciences, Asian Congress of Neurological Surgeons, Indian Society of Palliative Medicine, Stemcell Research Forum of India, Indian Society of Oncology and Common Wealth Association for Mental Handicap and Developmental Disabilities. He is the president of the Indian Society for Sterotactic and Functional Neurosurgery and the vice president of the Indian Society for Paediatric Neurosurgery.

Legacy
Venkataramana is credited with over 25000 neurosurgeries over the past 30 years. Reports credit him with the first neuroendoscopic surgery, CT Guided stereotactic surgery, Deep Brain Stimulation surgery for Parkinson's disease and sacral nerve stimulation for neurogenic bladder dysfunction in Karnataka. He has performed the Disc Nucleoplasty for lumbar and cervical disc prolapse and the transplantation of autologous bone marrow derived mesenchymal stem cells for Parkinson's disease for the first time in India. He is known to have introduced microdialysis of brain and stem cell therapy for cerebral palsy for the first time in Asia.

Venkataramana has published over 75 papers in peer reviewed national and international journals and has contributed chapters in various text books on neurosurgery. He has also conducted several continuing medical education (CME) programmes and has delivered keynote addresses at many conferences. He is the founder of ANSA Research Foundation and Comprehensive Trauma Consortium, both non governmental organizations involved in research on neurological disorders. He has also founded the Dhanwantari Trust for providing free medical treatment to the poorer sections of the society and established a free ambulance service, CTC Sanjeevani, in Karnataka. His involvement has been reported in many medical emergencies in and around the state of Karnataka and his contribution is reported in the establishment of the first brain tumour bank in India.

Awards and recognitions
Venkataramana is a recipient of the Silver Jubilee Award of NIMHANS for the best outgoing student in 1986. He has been felicitated by the Rotary International three times (2001, 2003 and 2006) and the Lions Club twice (2001 and 2005). In 2002, he received the Dr. B. C. Roy Award, the highest Indian award in the medical category, followed by Rajiv Gandhi Shiromani Award in 2006 and PRCI Chanakya Award in 2007. The Government of Karnataka awarded him Rajyotsava Prashasti, their second highest civilian award in 2008. He is also a recipient of NTR Award and the 2011 Sir M. Visvesvaraya Global Leadership Award. Karnataka Seva Puraskara Award, Sujayashree Award, Sadhana Rathna Prashasthi, Druvarathna Award, Trinity Vaidya Rathna Award and Dayananda Sagar Award are some of the other honours received by Venkataramana.

See also

 Stereotactic surgery
 Deep brain stimulation
 Stem cell therapy
 Cerebral palsy
 Parkinson's disease

References

External links
 
 
 

Living people
Year of birth missing (living people)
Indian medical writers
Indian medical academics
Medical doctors from Karnataka
Indian neurosurgeons
Dr. B. C. Roy Award winners
20th-century Indian medical doctors
Recipients of the Rajyotsava Award 2008
20th-century surgeons